Fəridə Vəzirova (February 15, 1924 – 1986) was a World War II veteran and professor of philology in Azerbaijan.

Life
Vəzirova was born in 1924 at Sardarli village in the Garyagin district. She entered the Philology Faculty of the Azerbaijan State University in 1940. She volunteered in 1942 at the invitation of the All-Union Leninist Young Communist League (Komsomol). She served as an ordinary soldier working with communications and she received several medals.

Vəzirova graduated with honours after leaving the army in October 1945 funded by Stalin's scholarship. In 1948, she began working as a writer for The Teacher, a literary worker newspaper.

She led the critics section of the magazine Azerbaijan. In 1952–53, she was a senior lecturer. In 1972, she published Mamed Said Ordubadi. In 1980, she  became a Professor of the History of Azerbaijani Literature.

She was awarded eight medals for her work in the front line of both labor and war.

Vəzirova died in Baku in 1986. In 2014, a ceremony took place on the 90th anniversary of her birth involving university professors, politicians and her daughter at the Writers Union of Azerbaijan.

See also 

 Sabina Almammadova
 Khatira Bashirli
 Sima Eyvazova

References

Bibliography
 Vezirova, Farida. Literary notes, studies. - Baku: Pagans, 1985. p. 187

1924 births
1986 deaths
20th-century Azerbaijani educators
Azerbaijani philologists
Women philologists
Baku State University alumni
Soviet military personnel of World War II
Soviet women in World War II
People from Fuzuli District
Komsomol
20th-century philologists
Soviet philologists
Vazirovs